A canonical model is a design pattern used to communicate between different data formats.  Essentially:  create a data model which is a superset of all the others ("canonical"), and create a "translator" module or layer to/from which all existing modules exchange data with other modules.  The individual modules can then be considered endpoints on an intelligent bus; the bus centralises all the data-translation intelligence.

A form of enterprise application integration, it is intended to reduce costs and standardize on agreed data definitions associated with integrating business systems.  A canonical model is any model that is canonical in nature, i.e. a model which is in the simplest form possible based on a standard, application integration (EAI) solution.  Most organizations also adopt a set of standards for message structure and content (message payload).  The desire for consistent message payload results in the construction of an enterprise or business domain canonical model common view within a given context.  Often the term canonical model is used interchangeably with integration strategy and often entails a move to a message-based integration methodology. A typical migration from point-to-point canonical data model, an enterprise design pattern which provides common data naming, definition and values within a generalized data framework. Advantages of using a canonical data model are reducing the number of data translations and reducing the maintenance effort.

Adoption of a comprehensive enterprise interfacing to message-based integration begins with a decision on the middleware to be used to transport messages between endpoints.  Often this decision results in the adoption of an enterprise service bus (ESB) or enterprise application integration (EAI) solution.  Most organizations also adopt a set of standards for message structure and content (message payload).  The desire for consistent message payload results in the construction of an enterprise form of XML schema built from the common model objects thus providing the desired consistency and re-usability while ensuring data integrity.

See also
 Canonical schema pattern
 Common data model
 Enterprise information integration
 Enterprise integration
 Information architecture
 List of XML schemas
 Service-oriented architecture
 Web service
 XML schema

References

External links
 Forrester Research, Canonical Model Management Forum
 Canonical Model, Canonical Schema, and Event Driven SOA
  Forrester Research, Canonical Information Modeling
   Enterprise Integration Patterns: Canonical Data Model
   Metadata Hub and Spokes (Canonical Data Domain)
Enterprise application integration
Enterprise architecture
Enterprise modelling
Software design patterns